Menguante Cove is a 1.47 km wide embayment indenting for 1.22 km the east coast of the horseshoe-shaped Half Moon Island in the South Shetland Islands, Antarctica. The area was visited by early 19th century sealers operating from nearby Yankee Harbour, and later by whalers; a whaling dory lies on the main landing beach on the southeast coast of the cove. Nowadays Menguante Cove is frequented by Antarctic cruise ships.

The Argentine Antarctic base Cámara is situated at the cove's head.

Location

Maps
 Chart of South Shetland including Coronation Island, &c. from the exploration of the sloop Dove in the years 1821 and 1822 by George Powell Commander of the same. Scale ca. 1:200000. London: Laurie, 1822.
 L.L. Ivanov et al. Antarctica: Livingston Island and Greenwich Island, South Shetland Islands. Scale 1:100000 topographic map. Sofia: Antarctic Place-names Commission of Bulgaria, 2005.
 L.L. Ivanov. Antarctica: Livingston Island and Greenwich, Robert, Snow and Smith Islands. Scale 1:120000 topographic map.  Troyan: Manfred Wörner Foundation, 2009.

Notes

References
 Half Moon Island. Visitor Site Guidelines. Secretariat of the Anarctic Treaty
 Cesar Garcia Esponda, Nestor Coria & Diego Montalti. Breeding birds at Half Moon Island, South Shetland Islands, Antarctica, 1995/96. Marine Ornithology, 2000, 28, pp. 59–62

Coves of Livingston Island